The 1993–94 NBA season was the Pacers' 18th season in the National Basketball Association, and 27th season as a franchise. The Pacers would undergo several changes as the club hired Larry Brown as head coach, acquired Derrick McKey from the Seattle SuperSonics, and signed free agent Haywoode Workman in the off-season. In December, the team signed free agent Byron Scott, who won championships with the Los Angeles Lakers in the 1980s. The Pacers got off to a rough start losing six of their first seven games, then later lost five straight in December leading to a 10–16 start. However, the team posted a 7-game winning streak between January and February, holding a 23–23 record at the All-Star break, and would play .500 ball until April. By winning their final eight games of the season, the Pacers were able to grab the #5 seed in the Eastern Conference and close out the season with a 47–35 record, fourth in the Central Division.

Reggie Miller led the team in scoring with 19.9 points per game, while Rik Smits provided the team with 15.7 points and 6.2 rebounds per game, and McKey averaged 12.0 points and 5.3 rebounds per game. In addition, Dale Davis provided with 11.7 points, 10.9 rebounds and 1.6 blocks per game, while Scott contributed 10.4 points per game off the bench as the team's sixth man, Workman provided with 7.7 points and 6.2 assists per game, and rookie forward Antonio Davis averaged 7.7 points and 6.2 rebounds per game off the bench. Pooh Richardson contributed 10.0 points and 6.4 assists per game, but only played just 37 games due to a shoulder injury.

In the Eastern Conference First Round of the playoffs, the Pacers swept the 4th-seeded Orlando Magic in three straight games for their first ever playoff series win since joining the NBA. The Pacers advanced to the Eastern Conference Semi-finals, and upset the top-seeded Atlanta Hawks in six games to reach the Eastern Conference Finals. The Pacers were challenging the heavily favored New York Knicks. The Pacers dropped the first two games in New York. Upon arriving in Indiana, the Pacers were able to win the next two games. In Game 5, Miller scored 25 points in the 4th quarter. In the process, Miller mocked Knicks fan and film director Spike Lee. The Pacers returned to Indiana for Game 6 with the opportunity to win the Eastern Conference Title. The Pacers would end up losing Game 6, and were forced to return to Madison Square Garden for Game 7. With the home court advantage, the Knicks would eliminate the Pacers. The Knicks would reach the NBA Finals, but would lose in seven games to the Houston Rockets.

Following the season, Richardson and second-year guard Malik Sealy, who both did not play in the postseason due to injuries, were both traded to the Los Angeles Clippers.

Offseason

NBA Draft

Roster

Regular season

Season standings

Record vs. opponents

Game log

Regular season

|- align="center" bgcolor="#ffcccc"
| 1
| November 5, 1993
| @ Atlanta
| L 110–116
|
|
|
| The Omni
| 0–1
|- align="center" bgcolor="#ffcccc"
| 2
| November 6, 1993
| Detroit
| L 107–113
|
|
|
| Market Square Arena
| 0–2
|- align="center" bgcolor="#ffcccc"
| 3
| November 9, 1993
| @ Orlando
| L 98–104
|
|
|
| Orlando Arena
| 0–3
|- align="center" bgcolor="#ccffcc"
| 4
| November 11, 1993
| @ New Jersey
| W 108–105 (OT)
|
|
|
| Brendan Byrne Arena
| 1–3
|- align="center" bgcolor="#ffcccc"
| 5
| November 12, 19938:00p.m. EST
| New York
| L 84–103
| Miller (24)
| A. Davis (7)
| Richardson (8)
| Market Square Arena13,954
| 1–4
|- align="center" bgcolor="#ffcccc"
| 6
| November 16, 1993
| Charlotte
| L 93–102
|
|
|
| Market Square Arena
| 1–5
|- align="center" bgcolor="#ffcccc"
| 7
| November 18, 19937:30p.m. EST
| Houston
| L 83–99
| Richardson (18)
| D. Davis (10)
| Richardson (6)
| Market Square Arena9,276
| 1–6
|- align="center" bgcolor="#ccffcc"
| 8
| November 20, 1993
| Boston
| W 100–94
|
|
|
| Market Square Arena
| 2–6
|- align="center" bgcolor="#ccffcc"
| 9
| November 22, 1993
| @ Boston
| W 102–71
|
|
|
| Hartford Civic Center
| 3–6
|- align="center" bgcolor="#ffcccc"
| 10
| November 24, 1993
| Philadelphia
| L 97–108
|
|
|
| Market Square Arena
| 3–7
|- align="center" bgcolor="#ffcccc"
| 11
| November 26, 1993
| L.A. Lakers
| L 100–102
|
|
|
| Market Square Arena
| 3–8
|- align="center" bgcolor="#ccffcc"
| 12
| November 29, 1993
| @ Sacramento
| W 105–103
|
|
|
| ARCO Arena
| 4–8

|- align="center" bgcolor="#ccffcc"
| 13
| December 1, 1993
| @ L.A. Clippers
| W 120–100
|
|
|
| Los Angeles Memorial Sports Arena
| 5–8
|- align="center" bgcolor="#ffcccc"
| 14
| December 2, 19939:00p.m. EST
| @ Utah
| L 87–103
| Miller (15)
| D. Davis (11)
| Richardson (8)
| Delta Center19,609
| 5–9
|- align="center" bgcolor="#ffcccc"
| 15
| December 4, 1993
| @ Golden State
| L 92–99
|
|
|
| Oakland-Alameda County Coliseum Arena
| 5–10
|- align="center" bgcolor="#ccffcc"
| 16
| December 7, 1993
| Sacramento
| W 105–87
|
|
|
| Market Square Arena
| 6–10
|- align="center" bgcolor="#ccffcc"
| 17
| December 9, 1993
| Orlando
| W 111–105
|
|
|
| Market Square Arena
| 7–10
|- align="center" bgcolor="#ffcccc"
| 18
| December 11, 19937:30p.m. EST
| @ New York
| L 91–98
| Miller (27)
| A. Davis (14)
| Miller (4)
| Madison Square Garden19,753
| 7–11
|- align="center" bgcolor="#ccffcc"
| 19
| December 14, 1993
| Washington
| W 106–87
|
|
|
| Market Square Arena
| 8–11
|- align="center" bgcolor="#ccffcc"
| 20
| December 16, 1993
| @ Atlanta
| W 99–81
|
|
|
| The Omni
| 9–11
|- align="center" bgcolor="#ccffcc"
| 21
| December 18, 1993
| New Jersey
| W 108–98
|
|
|
| Market Square Arena
| 10–11
|- align="center" bgcolor="#ffcccc"
| 22
| December 20, 1993
| @ Phoenix
| L 94–102
|
|
|
| America West Arena
| 10–12
|- align="center" bgcolor="#ffcccc"
| 23
| December 21, 1993
| @ Seattle
| L 88–91
|
|
|
| Market Square Arena
| 10–13
|- align="center" bgcolor="#ffcccc"
| 24
| December 23, 1993
| @ Portland
| L 96–108
|
|
|
| Memorial Coliseum
| 10–14
|- align="center" bgcolor="#ffcccc"
| 25
| December 26, 1993
| @ Cleveland
| L 103–107 (OT)
|
|
|
| Richfield Coliseum
| 10–15
|- align="center" bgcolor="#ffcccc"
| 26
| December 30, 1993
| San Antonio
| L 82–107
|
|
|
| Market Square Arena
| 10–16

|- align="center" bgcolor="#ccffcc"
| 27
| January 4, 1994
| Cleveland
| W 104–99
|
|
|
| Market Square Arena
| 11–16
|- align="center" bgcolor="#ffcccc"
| 28
| January 5, 1994
| @ Washington
| L 95–97
|
|
|
| USAir Arena
| 11–17
|- align="center" bgcolor="#ccffcc"
| 29
| January 8, 1994
| @ Detroit
| W 101–92
|
|
|
| The Palace of Auburn Hills
| 12–17
|- align="center" bgcolor="#ccffcc"
| 30
| January 11, 1994
| @ Milwaukee
| W 82–76
|
|
|
| Bradley Center
| 13–17
|- align="center" bgcolor="#ccffcc"
| 31
| January 12, 1994
| Denver
| W 107–96
|
|
|
| Market Square Arena
| 14–17
|- align="center" bgcolor="#ffcccc"
| 32
| January 14, 1994
| @ Philadelphia
| L 102–104 (OT)
|
|
|
| The Spectrum
| 14–18
|- align="center" bgcolor="#ccffcc"
| 33
| January 15, 1994
| Atlanta
| W 94–91
|
|
|
| Market Square Arena
| 15–18
|- align="center" bgcolor="#ccffcc"
| 34
| January 19, 1994
| Miami
| W 109–92
|
|
|
| Market Square Arena
| 16–18
|- align="center" bgcolor="#ffcccc"
| 35
| January 21, 1994
| @ Chicago
| L 95–96
|
|
|
| Chicago Stadium
| 16–19
|- align="center" bgcolor="#ffcccc"
| 36
| January 22, 1994
| Chicago
| L 81–90
|
|
|
| Market Square Arena
| 16–20
|- align="center" bgcolor="#ffcccc"
| 37
| January 24, 1994
| Milwaukee
| L 88–96
|
|
|
| Market Square Arena
| 16–21
|- align="center" bgcolor="#ffcccc"
| 38
| January 26, 1994
| @ L.A. Lakers
| L 99–103
|
|
|
| Great Western Forum
| 16–22
|- align="center" bgcolor="#ffcccc"
| 39
| January 27, 1994
| @ Denver
| L 106–113
|
|
|
| McNichols Sports Arena
| 16–23
|- align="center" bgcolor="#ccffcc"
| 40
| January 29, 19948:30p.m. EST
| @ Houston
| W 119–108
| Miller (21)
| A. Davis (7)
| McKey (8)
| The Summit16,611
| 17–23

|- align="center" bgcolor="#ccffcc"
| 41
| February 1, 1994
| Washington
| W 116–96
|
|
|
| Market Square Arena
| 18–23
|- align="center" bgcolor="#ccffcc"
| 42
| February 2, 1994
| @ Charlotte
| W 124–112
|
|
|
| Charlotte Coliseum
| 19–23
|- align="center" bgcolor="#ccffcc"
| 43
| February 4, 1994
| Minnesota
| W 114–93
|
|
|
| Market Square Arena
| 20–23
|- align="center" bgcolor="#ccffcc"
| 44
| February 5, 1994
| Charlotte
| W 111–102
|
|
|
| Market Square Arena
| 21–23
|- align="center" bgcolor="#ccffcc"
| 45
| February 7, 1994
| Golden State
| W 104–99
|
|
|
| Market Square Arena
| 22–23
|- align="center" bgcolor="#ccffcc"
| 46
| February 9, 1994
| @ Miami
| W 102–98
|
|
|
| Miami Arena
| 23–23
|- align="center"
|colspan="9" bgcolor="#bbcaff"|All-Star Break
|- style="background:#cfc;"
|- bgcolor="#bbffbb"
|- align="center" bgcolor="#ffcccc"
| 47
| February 15, 1994
| @ San Antonio
| L 100–109
|
|
|
| Alamodome
| 23–24
|- align="center" bgcolor="#ccffcc"
| 48
| February 17, 1994
| @ Dallas
| W 84–73
|
|
|
| Reunion Arena
| 24–24
|- align="center" bgcolor="#ccffcc"
| 49
| February 20, 1994
| Seattle
| W 101–95
|
|
|
| Market Square Arena
| 25–24
|- align="center" bgcolor="#ccffcc"
| 50
| February 22, 1994
| Dallas
| W 107–101
|
|
|
| Market Square Arena
| 26–24
|- align="center" bgcolor="#ffcccc"
| 51
| February 23, 1994
| @ Orlando
| L 99–103
|
|
|
| Orlando Arena
| 26–25
|- align="center" bgcolor="#ccffcc"
| 52
| February 25, 1994
| Detroit
| W 110–90
|
|
|
| Market Square Arena
| 27–25
|- align="center" bgcolor="#ccffcc"
| 53
| February 26, 1994
| @ Chicago
| W 96–86
|
|
|
| Chicago Stadium
| 28–25

|- align="center" bgcolor="#ccffcc"
| 54
| March 1, 1994
| Portland
| W 106–94
|
|
|
| Market Square Arena
| 29–25
|- align="center" bgcolor="#ccffcc"
| 55
| March 4, 1994
| New Jersey
| W 126–110
|
|
|
| Market Square Arena
| 30–25
|- align="center" bgcolor="#ffcccc"
| 56
| March 5, 1994
| @ Atlanta
| L 88–90
|
|
|
| The Omni
| 30–26
|- align="center" bgcolor="#ccffcc"
| 57
| March 9, 1994
| @ Milwaukee
| W 105–94
|
|
|
| Bradley Center
| 31–26
|- align="center" bgcolor="#ffcccc"
| 58
| March 11, 1994
| @ New Jersey
| L 73–87
|
|
|
| Brendan Byrne Arena
| 31–27
|- align="center" bgcolor="#ccffcc"
| 59
| March 12, 1994
| Milwaukee
| W 104–97
|
|
|
| Market Square Arena
| 32–27
|- align="center" bgcolor="#ffcccc"
| 60
| March 15, 19947:30p.m. EST
| @ New York
| L 82–88
| Miller (22)
| D. Davis (13)
| Richardson (4)
| Madison Square Garden19,753
| 32–28
|- align="center" bgcolor="#ccffcc"
| 61
| March 16, 1994
| Phoenix
| W 109–98
|
|
|
| Market Square Arena
| 33–28
|- align="center" bgcolor="#ffcccc"
| 62
| March 18, 1994
| Atlanta
| L 78–81
|
|
|
| Market Square Arena
| 33–29
|- align="center" bgcolor="#ccffcc"
| 63
| March 19, 19947:30p.m. EST
| Utah
| W 107–103
| Smits (19)
| D. Davis (16)
| Workman (7)
| Market Square Arena15,374
| 34–29
|- align="center" bgcolor="#ffcccc"
| 64
| March 22, 1994
| @ Cleveland
| L 61–93
|
|
|
| Richfield Coliseum
| 34–30
|- align="center" bgcolor="#ccffcc"
| 65
| March 23, 1994
| Cleveland
| W 78–77
|
|
|
| Market Square Arena
| 35–30
|- align="center" bgcolor="#ffcccc"
| 66
| March 25, 19947:30p.m. EST
| New York
| L 82–85
| Miller (18)
| A. Davis (12)
| Workman (6)
| Market Square Arena16,675
| 35–31
|- align="center" bgcolor="#ffcccc"
| 67
| March 26, 1994
| @ Chicago
| L 88–90
|
|
|
| Chicago Stadium
| 35–32
|- align="center" bgcolor="#ccffcc"
| 68
| March 28, 1994
| L.A. Clippers
| W 126–93
|
|
|
| Market Square Arena
| 36–32
|- align="center" bgcolor="#ccffcc"
| 69
| March 30, 1994
| @ Boston
| W 103–99
|
|
|
| Boston Garden
| 37–33

|- align="center" bgcolor="#ffcccc"
| 70
| April 1, 1994
| @ Miami
| L 91–101
|
|
|
| Miami Arena
| 37–33
|- align="center" bgcolor="#ccffcc"
| 71
| April 2, 1994
| Orlando
| W 128–113
|
|
|
| Market Square Arena
| 38–33
|- align="center" bgcolor="#ccffcc"
| 72
| April 5, 1994
| Detroit
| W 105–89
|
|
|
| Market Square Arena
| 39–33
|- align="center" bgcolor="#ffcccc"
| 73
| April 6, 1994
| @ Charlotte
| L 90–129
|
|
|
| Charlotte Coliseum
| 39–34
|- align="center" bgcolor="#ffcccc"
| 74
| April 8, 1994
| Chicago
| L 94–100
|
|
|
| Market Square Arena
| 39–35
|- align="center" bgcolor="#ccffcc"
| 75
| April 11, 1994
| Boston
| W 121–108
|
|
|
| Market Square Arena
| 40–35
|- align="center" bgcolor="#ccffcc"
| 76
| April 13, 1994
| @ Philadelphia
| W 115–87
|
|
|
| The Spectrum
| 41–35
|- align="center" bgcolor="#ccffcc"
| 77
| April 15, 1994
| @ Minnesota
| W 130–112
|
|
|
| Target Center
| 42–35
|- align="center" bgcolor="#ccffcc"
| 78
| April 17, 1994
| @ Detroit
| W 104–99
|
|
|
| The Palace of Auburn Hills
| 43–35
|- align="center" bgcolor="#ccffcc"
| 79
| April 19, 1994
| @ Washington
| W 111–110
|
|
|
| USAir Arena
| 44–35
|- align="center" bgcolor="#ccffcc"
| 80
| April 20, 1994
| Cleveland
| W 109–98
|
|
|
| Market Square Arena
| 45–35
|- align="center" bgcolor="#ccffcc"
| 81
| April 22, 1994
| Philadelphia
| W 133–88
|
|
|
| Market Square Arena
| 46–35
|- align="center" bgcolor="#ccffcc"
| 82
| April 23, 1994
| Miami
| W 114–81
|
|
|
| Market Square Arena
| 47–35

Playoffs

|- align="center" bgcolor="#ccffcc"
| 1
| April 28, 1994
| @ Orlando
| W 89–88
| Miller (24)
| D. Davis,McKey (10)
| Workman (11)
| Orlando Arena15,291
| 1–0
|- align="center" bgcolor="#ccffcc"
| 2
| April 30, 1994
| @ Orlando
| W 103–101
| Miller (32)
| D. Davis (9)
| Workman (10)
| Orlando Arena15,291
| 2–0
|- align="center" bgcolor="#ccffcc"
| 3
| May 2, 1994
| Orlando
| W 99–86
| Miller (31)
| D. Davis (14)
| McKey (6)
| Market Square Arena16,562
| 3–0
|-

|- align="center" bgcolor="#ccffcc"
| 1
| May 10, 1994
| @ Atlanta
| W 96–85
| Miller (18)
| D. Davis (15)
| Workman (8)
| The Omni13,190
| 1–0
|- align="center" bgcolor="#ffcccc"
| 2
| May 12, 1994
| @ Atlanta
| L 69–92
| Miller (12)
| D. Davis (18)
| Miller,Workman (5)
| The Omni15,854
| 1–1
|- align="center" bgcolor="#ccffcc"
| 3
| May 14, 1994
| Atlanta
| W 101–81
| Smits (27)
| Scott (8)
| Workman (7)
| Market Square Arena16,545
| 2–1
|- align="center" bgcolor="#ccffcc"
| 4
| May 15, 1994
| Atlanta
| W 102–86
| Miller (25)
| McKey,Smits (8)
| Workman (8)
| Market Square Arena16,561
| 3–1
|- align="center" bgcolor="#ffcccc"
| 5
| May 17, 1994
| @ Atlanta
| L 76–88
| Miller (22)
| McKey (13)
| Workman (9)
| The Omni14,849
| 3–2
|- align="center" bgcolor="#ccffcc"
| 6
| May 19, 1994
| Atlanta
| W 98–79
| Smits (27)
| A. Davis,D. Davis,McKey (10)
| Workman (10)
| Market Square Arena16,552
| 4–2
|-

|- align="center" bgcolor="#ffcccc"
| 1
| May 24, 19947:00p.m. EST
| @ New York
| L 89–100
| Smits (27)
| D. Davis,Smits (10)
| Workman (7)
| Madison Square Garden19,763
| 0–1
|- align="center" bgcolor="#ffcccc"
| 2
| May 26, 19947:00p.m. EST
| @ New York
| L 78–89
| Miller (23)
| D. Davis (11)
| McKey,Workman (6)
| Madison Square Garden19,763
| 0–2
|- align="center" bgcolor="#ccffcc"
| 3
| May 28, 19942:30p.m. EST
| New York
| W 88–68
| McKey (15)
| A. Davis (10)
| Workman (7)
| Market Square Arena16,530
| 1–2
|- align="center" bgcolor="#ccffcc"
| 4
| May 30, 19942:30p.m. EST
| New York
| W 83–77
| Miller (31)
| D. Davis,Miller,Workman (7)
| Workman (6)
| Market Square Arena16,536
| 2–2
|- align="center" bgcolor="#ccffcc"
| 5
| June 1, 19948:00p.m. EST
| @ New York
| W 93–86
| Miller (39)
| A. Davis (9)
| Miller (6)
| Madison Square Garden19,763
| 3–2
|- align="center" bgcolor="#ffcccc"
| 6
| June 3, 19948:00p.m. EST
| New York
| L 91–98
| Miller (27)
| A. Davis (9)
| Fleming,McKey (5)
| Market Square Arena16,529
| 3–3
|- align="center" bgcolor="#ffcccc"
| 7
| June 5, 19946:00p.m. EST
| @ New York
| L 90–94
| Reggie Miller (25)
| A. Davis,Smits, (6)
| McKey,Workman (8)
| Madison Square Garden19,763
| 3–4
|-

Player Statistics

Season

Playoffs

Player Statistics Citation:

Awards and records

Transactions

References

  Pacers on Basketball Reference

Indiana Pacers seasons
Pace
Pace
Indiana